John R. "Bo" Farrington (January 18, 1936 – July 27, 1964) was an American football player for the Chicago Bears of the National Football League.  He attended Prairie View A&M University.  Farrington made history with Bill Wade when (in Wade's first start as quarterback) he received a 98 yard touchdown pass on October 8, 1961.

Farrington was killed in an automobile accident on July 27, 1964 in Rensselaer, Indiana at the age of 28 along with teammate Willie Galimore.

References

External links

1936 births
1964 deaths
People from Fort Bend County, Texas
Players of American football from Texas
American football tight ends
Prairie View A&M Panthers football players
Chicago Bears players
Road incident deaths in Indiana